Star Spangled Ice Cream was an American ice cream company. They marketed their ice cream as a politically conservative alternative to Ben & Jerry's which the founders felt to be too liberal. Similarly to Ben & Jerry's, the names of the ice cream were puns, usually plays on conservative phrases and ideas, such as  "Smaller Governmint", "I Hate the French Vanilla," "Navy Battle Chip,"  "Bill Clinton Im-peach" and "Choc & Awe". The company donated 10% of its profits to organizations that it felt supported the United States Armed Forces.

Reception 
The Star Spangled Ice Cream company received both criticism and praise through email, both of which were posted on their now-defunct website. Ted Nugent had said that he was a fan of the "Gun Nut" flavor.

See also
Freedom fries
Minuteman Salsa

References

External links
Company homepage
 List of flavors as of October 2007

Discontinued products
Iraq War